United Nations Security Council Resolution 328, adopted on March 10, 1973, after receiving a report from the Special Mission established under resolution 326 and reaffirming previous statements the Council encouraged the United Kingdom, as the administering power, to convene a national constitutional conference where the "genuine representatives of the people of Zimbabwe" could work out a settlement relating to the future of the country.

The Council also called upon the government to take all effective measures to bring about the conditions necessary to enable the people of Rhodesia to exercise their right to self-determination, the unconditional release of all political prisoners/detainees/restrictees, the repeal of all repressive and discriminatory legislation and re removal of all restriction on political activity.

The resolution was approved by 13 votes to none against; the United Kingdom and United States abstained from the vote.

See also
 History of Rhodesia
 History of Zambia
 List of United Nations Security Council Resolutions 301 to 400 (1971–1976)

References 
Text of the Resolution at undocs.org

External links
 

 0328
 0328
March 1973 events